Omid Musawi (born 1 January 2001) is an Afghan footballer who currently plays for Para Hills Knights in the SA State League 1, and the Afghanistan national team.

Club career
Musawi fled from Afghanistan at age five and eventually settled in the Apledoorn, Netherlands. At age ten he was scouted by FC Twente and signed to their academy. In October 2019 his contract was terminated and he left the club because of personality conflicts and a change of coaching staff. During his time at the club, he was ultimately promoted to the reserve team, for which he made three appearances. He also tallied ten goals and three assists in thirty-one appearances for the under-19 side. 

Following his long stint with Twente, he had spells with SBV Vitesse and PEC Zwolle. He eventually signed with one of several interested clubs in Australia, Para Hills Knights SC. Para Hills advanced to the State League 1 South Australia Grand Final that season. Despite a goal by Musawi, the club ultimately fell to West Adelaide SC 3–4 and missed out on promotion to the National Premier Leagues South Australia. During the 2022 season he made five league appearances, scoring one goal. He made an additional four appearances and scored another goal in the playoffs. Following the season, he returned to the Netherlands to train with FC Dordrecht.

International career
Musawi made his senior international debut on 1 June 2022 in a friendly against Vietnam. A week later he made his competitive debut in a 2023 AFC Asian Cup qualification match against Hong Kong.

International career statistics

References

External links
 
 
 

Living people
2001 births
Afghan footballers
Afghanistan international footballers
Association football forwards